Lake Monkey Business is a private park and lake not opened to the public located in northern Leon County, Florida and within the planned private community of Killearn Lakes Plantation.

History 
Though the lake was created by Julian C. "Bull" Headley (of Kentucky) in the early to mid-1950s, as part of Bull Run Plantation, the land which Lake Monkey Business is on was originally part of Frances C. Griscom's Water Oak Plantation. The lake is within the Killearn Lakes Plantation development, north of Tallahassee, Florida. The present-day Bull Headley Road frames the western boundary of Killearn Lakes Plantation; the northern terminus of the road ends at a public boat ramp for the nearby Lake Iamonia.

Water Oak's purchase in 1951 the name change occurred with Headley making several enhancements to the property, including a dam, a new brick mansion, bathhouse, swimming pool, and Headley's own duck lake, which he called Lake Monkey Business. This was the last of Headley's land alteration projects "to monkey around with" – hence the name – which sought to attract waterfowl.

There are three other lakes which he created by damming the feeder stream further up the drainage system. These consist (in order of drainage) of Lake Petty Gulf, Lake Dianne, and Lake Blue Heron, which then drains into Monkey Business. Lake Monkey Business is fed through the prominent sweeping estuary arm to the south west. The lakes were drawn down during spring and summer months and refilled by the autumn rains and attract many migrating waterfowl. This practice is no longer employed on these lakes, but remains common on nearby hunting plantations.

A small, natural island, approximately 200 feet in diameter, within Lake Monkey Business provides a natural retreat for water fowl. The island is located about halfway between the isthmus and the western end of the lake. The island contains many large hardwood and pine trees and relatively dense underbrush.

In 1964, Headley sold Bull Run Plantation to a financial syndicate of sportsmen interested in a recreational preserve. Kinhega Lodge was established and Lake Monkey Business remained. Kinhega Lodge would eventually become Kinhega Lodge Estates, Limited. In the early 1970s the property was sold again to investors, who developed the property into Killearn Lakes Plantation, a development of over 4500 homes.

Located approximately 11 miles north of Tallahassee, Florida's center, Killearn Lakes Plantation is a planned, heavily forested suburban development which fully surrounds the lake. The lands on the southern and eastern perimeter of the lake form a part of the private Golden Eagle development. The western and northern perimeter is rural property in Leon County within Killearn Lakes Plantation.

Use of the lake is exclusive to residents of Killearn Lakes Plantation. Access to the lake and its boat ramp is provided by a gated access road.

Recreation 
A gated entrance on Turkey Hill Trail leads to a boat ramp and park. The park is located on a grassy isthmus with ample shade provided by many Spanish moss-draped live oaks and three docks useful to residents for catching various species of panfish (genus Lepomis). A boat ramp is located at the park's north end. Until about 2000, playground equipment was provided at the park. The lake itself has a low population of juvenile American Alligators. State-licensed nuisance alligator trappers are usually called upon to remove larger alligators once they reach a length of four to six feet (2 m). Although it is reported that an 8-foot (2.46 m) specimen had matured there until captured.

The lake is considered "well stocked" in that it supports a large community of largemouth Bass and various catfish. The lake is generally green in color with photosynthetic plankton and low in weeds due to invasive grass carp. The bottom of the lake is between 6–10 feet (1.8–3.1m) in depth and strewn with small branches and trees due to beaver activity. No swimming is allowed due to alligators and rare plankton blooms that have turned the water bright orange for months.

Through 2008, on July 4, the Killearn Lakes Plantation Homeowners Association provided a fireworks display over Lake Monkey Business paid for by residents' dues. In 2009 and 2010, the homeowners association voted to suspend the display due to financial constraints.

References 

 Killearn Lakes Homeowers Assoc.
 Business Discussions

Parks in Leon County, Florida
Privately held companies based in Florida